Pleogyne is a monotypic genus of flowering plants belonging to the family Menispermaceae. The only species is Pleogyne australis.

Its native range is Northern Western Australia, Northeastern and Eastern Queensland.

References

Menispermaceae
Menispermaceae genera
Monotypic Ranunculales genera